Le Rhodanien, or the Rhodanien, was an express train with its southern terminus in Marseilles, France.  Operated by the Société Nationale des Chemins de fer français (SNCF), it was named using the French language adjective derived from the Rhone river; the name alludes, amongst other things, to the river, its valley, and the dialect of the Franco-Provençal language that is spoken there.

The train had two distinct eras.  Between 1964 and 1971, it was an international Rapide linking Geneva, Switzerland with Marseilles.  In 1971, the train's route and classification were radically altered, and Le Rhodanien became a first-class-only domestic Trans Europ Express (TEE) running between Paris and Marseilles.  It was discontinued in 1978.

Formation (consist)
The Geneva–Marseille Rhodanien was made up of SNCF  diesel multiple unit railcars, in a two- to five-car formation, in each case with a power car at each end.  These vehicles had previously been used on TEE trains.

The Paris–Marseille train was formed of passenger cars, hauled by an SNCF 1.5 kV DC, Class CC 6500 electric locomotive.  The passenger cars were a rake of SNCF Mistral 69-type , and were initially an A4Dtux, three A8tu, two A8u and a Vr.  From 1 June 1975, the Paris–Marseille train was augmented by one or two extra coaches when required.

While Le Rhodanien was operating as a TEE, its dining car was staffed by the Compagnie Internationale des Wagons-Lits (CIWL).

See also

 History of rail transport in France
 List of named passenger trains of Europe

References

 
 
 

Named passenger trains of France
Named passenger trains of Switzerland
Trans Europ Express
Railway services introduced in 1964